Roskovec is a town and a municipality in Fier County, south-central Albania. The municipality was formed at the 2015 local government reform by the merger of the former municipalities Kuman, Kurjan, Roskovec and Strum, that became municipal units. The seat of the municipality is the town of Roskovec. The total population is 21,742 (2011 census), in a total area of 118.08 km2. The population of the former municipality at the 2011 census was 4,975.

Notable people
Roela Pasku, 3 times Chess National Champion

References

External links
Albanian Census Figures

 
Municipalities in Fier County
Administrative units of Roskovec
Towns in Albania